Satsanapong Wattayuchutikul (born August 6, 1992) is a Thai professional footballer who plays for Chiangmai United in the Thai League 1.

Personal life 
Satsanapong is a Christian and is of Chinese descent.

Honours

Club
Muangthong United
 Thai Premier League Champions (1) : 2010

References

External links
 

supersubthailand.com

1992 births
Living people
Satsanapong Wattayuchutikul
Satsanapong Wattayuchutikul
Association football midfielders
Satsanapong Wattayuchutikul
Satsanapong Wattayuchutikul
Satsanapong Wattayuchutikul
Satsanapong Wattayuchutikul
Satsanapong Wattayuchutikul
Satsanapong Wattayuchutikul
Satsanapong Wattayuchutikul
Satsanapong Wattayuchutikul
Satsanapong Wattayuchutikul